Rangi Hauiti Pokiha (1895–1980) was a New Zealand farmer, surveyor, and orator. Of Māori descent, he identified with the Ngā Rauru and Ngāti Pamoana iwi. He was born in Koriniti beside the Whanganui River in 1895.

References

1895 births
1980 deaths
People from Whanganui
New Zealand surveyors
Ngā Rauru people
Te Āti Haunui-a-Pāpārangi people